Anneliese Augustin (24 April 1930 – 3 November 2021) was a German politician. From 13 January 1984 to 1987 and from 6 December 1989 to 1998 she was a member of the Christian Democratic Union of Germany (CDU) in the German Bundestag for the state of Hesse for four terms.

Life 
After graduating from high school in Lörrach and studying in Basel and Freiburg, she received her licence to practise pharmacy in 1957. She worked in this profession as a self-employed pharmacist from 1958 until she joined the Bundestag.

Augustin was married and has two children.

References 

1930 births
2021 deaths
Politicians from Kassel
Members of the Bundestag for Hesse
Members of the Bundestag 1994–1998
Members of the Bundestag 1990–1994
Members of the Bundestag 1987–1990
Members of the Bundestag 1983–1987
Female members of the Bundestag
20th-century German women politicians
Members of the Bundestag for the Christian Democratic Union of Germany